Statistics of Armenian Premier League in the 1995/96 season.

 Homenetmen Yerevan changed their name to FC Pyunik due to changes in the club ownership and sponsorship.
 Yerazank FC disbanded and yielded their place to Karabakh. Karabakh, a Nagorno-Karabakh Republic-based club from Stepanakert, were relocated to Yerevan.
 Kotayk Abovyan and Banants Kotayk were merged and the name of the merger was limited to FC Kotayk.
 Newly-established FC Yerevan was promoted to replace Banants Kotayk.

League table

Results

Promotion/relegation play-off

Top goalscorers

See also
 1995–96 in Armenian football
 1995–96 Armenian First League
 1996 Armenian Cup

Armenian Premier League seasons
Armenia
1995 in Armenian football
1996 in Armenian football